The 1996 United States presidential election in New Mexico took place on November 5, 1996. All fifty states and the District of Columbia, were part of the 1996 United States presidential election. State voters chose five electors to the Electoral College, which selected the president and vice president.

New Mexico was won by incumbent United States President Bill Clinton of Arkansas, who was running against Kansas Senator Bob Dole. Clinton ran a second time with former Tennessee Senator Al Gore as Vice President, and Dole ran with former New York Congressman Jack Kemp.

New Mexico weighed in for this election as 1% more Republican than the national average. The presidential election of 1996 was a very multi-partisan election for New Mexico, with nearly ten percent of the electorate voting for third-party candidates, and two third-party candidates receiving more than 1% of the vote. The majority of counties in New Mexico turned out for Clinton, including the highly populated areas of Doña Ana County, Santa Fe County and Albuquerque’s Bernalillo County. In his second bid for the presidency, Ross Perot led the newly reformed Reform Party to gain over five percent of the votes in New Mexico, and to pull in support nationally as the most popular third-party candidate to run for United States Presidency in recent times.

, this is the last election in which the following counties voted for a Democratic presidential candidate: Sierra, Eddy, and De Baca.

Results

Results by county

See also
 Presidency of Bill Clinton

References

New Mexico
1996
1996 New Mexico elections